Constantine (820s or 830s – before 836) was an infant prince of the Amorian dynasty who briefly ruled as co-emperor of the Byzantine Empire sometime in the 830s, alongside his father Theophilos. Most information about Constantine's short life and titular reign is unclear, although it is known that he was born sometime in the 820s or 830s and was installed as co-emperor soon after his birth. He died sometime before 836, possibly after falling into a palace cistern.

Life
Constantine was born to the Byzantine Emperor Theophilos and his wife Empress Theodora. The coinage issued under Theophilos suggests that Constantine was their firstborn son, and he was perhaps their eldest child, although there remains a possibility that he was any one of their first four. He had five sisters: Thekla, Anna, Anastasia, Pulcheria, and Maria. Constantine and his family belonged to the Amorian dynasty, which had ruled the Byzantine Empire since the accession of Constantine's paternal grandfather Michael II to the imperial throne in 820. Unusually, Theophilos defied standard naming conventions, as his son was not named after Michael II; instead, Theophilos chose the name Constantine, which the Byzantinist Judith Herrin explains could be an homage to Constantine the Great or a hope that the prince would continue the iconoclastic religious policies of previous emperors named Constantine.

As Theophilos had succeeded Michael II on 2 October 829, Constantine was heir to his father's throne and was crowned co-emperor a short time after his birth. He died shortly afterwards, still in his infancy. The British historian Philip Grierson used the inscription on Constantine's coffin, which read , meaning "little coffin", as evidence to support the claim that Constantine died young.

There is little clarity as to the dates of his birth, coronation and death. The historian Lynda Garland argues that Constantine was born in 834 and died when he was two years old, assuming that he was crowned immediately after his birth. Herrin also agrees with this birth date. 

Constantine's saddened father constructed gardens on the spot of his son's death, although the  points out that this story may actually refer to a son of another emperor, not Constantine. His parents buried him in a sarcophagus made of Thessalian marble in the Church of the Holy Apostles.

Notes

References

Sources 

 
 
 
 
 
 

 
 

9th-century Byzantine people
Byzantine junior emperors
9th-century births
9th-century deaths
830s deaths
Heirs apparent who never acceded
Burials at the Church of the Holy Apostles
Year of birth uncertain
Year of death uncertain
Phrygian dynasty
Sons of Byzantine emperors
Royalty and nobility who died as children
Monarchs who died as children
Medieval child monarchs